The Avery Russell House, also called the Martin-Russell House or the Campbell Station Inn, is a historic home located at 11409 Kingston Pike in Farragut, Tennessee, United States.

The Federal-style two story brick structure was built by Samuel Martin as an inn around 1835, on the site of David Campbell's 1787 blockhouse.  Just before the Civil War, the inn was sold to Avery Russell, who then used it as a family residence.  It remained in the Russell family for six generations. During the Battle of Campbell's Station in 1863, the house served as a temporary hospital.

Although it has had several alterations, the house remains an example of rural East Tennessee architecture.  It is listed on the National Register of Historic Places.

References

External links
 National Register of Historic Places
 Down the Dixie-Lee Highway – Metro Pulse article

Farragut, Tennessee
Federal architecture in Tennessee
Houses completed in 1835
Houses in Knox County, Tennessee
Houses on the National Register of Historic Places in Tennessee
National Register of Historic Places in Knox County, Tennessee
1835 establishments in Tennessee